"You Put the Beat in My Heart" is a song written by Don Pfrimmer and Rick Giles, and recorded by American country music artist Eddie Rabbitt.  It was released in September 1983 as the first single from his Greatest Hits Vol. II compilation album.  The song reached number 10 on the Billboard Hot Country Singles & Tracks chart.

Chart performance

References

1983 singles
1983 songs
Eddie Rabbitt songs
Songs written by Rick Giles
Songs written by Don Pfrimmer
Song recordings produced by Snuff Garrett
Song recordings produced by David Malloy
Warner Records singles